Gorolo (郭络罗氏) was a clan of Manchu nobility belonging to Bordered Yellow Banner

Notable figures

Males 

 Antamu (安塔穆)
 Sanguanbao (三官保), served as third rank literary official (侍郎)
 Daobao (道保), served as second rank military official (副都统)
 Duopuku (多普库), served as fourth rank military official (左领)
 Tepuku (特普库),served as fourth rank military official (左领)
 Epuku (鄂普库), served as fifth rank literary official (郎中)
 Tapuku (他普库)
Jinengte (及能特)

 Prince Consorts

Females 
Imperial Consort
 Consort
 Consort Yi (1660–1733), the Kangxi Emperor's consort, the mother of Yunki (1680–1732), Yuntang (1683–1726) and Yinzi (1685–1696)

 Noble Lady
 Noble Lady, the Kangxi Emperor's noble lady, the mother of Princess Kejing (1679–1735) and Yinju (1683–1684)

Princess Consort
 Primary Consort
 Cuyen's first wife, the mother of Dudu (1597–1642) and Guohuan (1598–1624)
 Yunsi's primary consort (d. 1726)
 Yunlu's primary consort, the mother of first son (1712), Princess Duanrou (1714–1755), third son (1715), Hongshen (1717–1719), second daughter (1720–1721) and Princess (1723–1752)

 Concubine
 Yun'e's concubine, the mother of first son (1701), Hongxu (1703–1708), third son (1704–1709), first daughter (1706–1743) and Hongjun (1711–1771)

References 

Manchu clans
Bordered Yellow Banner
Qing dynasty people